The Fernandezian Region is a Floristic Region which includes two island groups, the Juan Fernández Islands and Desventuradas Islands archipelagos, that lie in the South Pacific Ocean off the west coast of Chile. It is in the Antarctic Floristic Kingdom, but often also included within the Neotropical Kingdom.

Endemic plant families include Lactoridaceae, with many endemic plant and animal genera are found here too.

References
 Takhtajan, Armen, 1986. Floristic Regions of the World. (translated by T.J. Crovello & A. Cronquist). University of California Press, Berkeley.

 
Floristic regions
Neotropical ecoregions
Ecoregions of Chile

Geography of Valparaíso Region
Juan Fernández Islands
Ecoregions of South America